is a Japanese romance shōjo manga series written and illustrated by Kazune Kawahara. Published by Shueisha, it was serialized on Bessatsu Margaret from August 11, 2008 to October 13, 2015 and was compiled into nineteen volumes. It is published in French by Panini Comics. A live action film adaptation of the same name was released in Japan on August 20, 2016.

Volumes

Reception
The manga has sold over 3.9 million copies.

References

External links

 
Romance anime and manga
Music in anime and manga
Shueisha franchises
Shueisha manga
2015 comics endings
Shōjo manga
Manga adapted into films